Zhi Cong "Peter" Li (born 23 August 1993 in Guangzhou) is a racing driver from China. He formerly competed in the FIA Formula 3 European Championship.

Li is best known for his involvement in a serious accident at a Formula 3 meeting at the Red Bull Ring in 2016 in which he broke both heels and fractured four vertebrae.

Racing record

Career summary

References

External links
Profile at Driver Database

Chinese racing drivers
1993 births
Living people

Asian Formula Renault Challenge drivers
Australian Formula 3 Championship drivers
Formula BMW Pacific drivers
Formula Masters China drivers
British Formula Three Championship drivers
FIA Formula 3 European Championship drivers
Asian Le Mans Series drivers
Asia Racing Team drivers
Carlin racing drivers
Jo Zeller Racing drivers
Fortec Motorsport drivers